Spitfire are a British rock band from Crawley, West Sussex, whose ever-changing line-up revolved around brothers Nick and Jeff Pitcher. Other members included Steve White, Justin Welch, Steven Walker (who went on to play in the Auteurs and Modern English), Matt Wise, and Scott Kenny.

Two early EPs on Eve Recordings saw the band linked to the shoegazing scene, and to the Scene That Celebrates Itself, although a cover of "The Six Million Dollar Man" theme staked out their retro appeal.

Around this time, the band were involved in several controversial incidents; including the handing out of backstage passes for groupies, and a string of apparently sexist proclamations to the music press of the time. The band later insisted that these incidents were merely ironic, and intended to poke fun at rock stars' posturing. Their debut album, Feverish, was released on Paperhouse Records in 1993.

'Feverish' is a 6-track compilation of the first two EVE Recordings EP's 'Translucent' & 'Superbaby', which was licensed to and released by the French label Danceteria in 1992.

Spitfire were hailed as influential by many New wave of new wave bands, and regularly gigged with S*M*A*S*H and These Animal Men between 1994 and 1996. The Pitcher brothers were resident DJs at Brighton club The Basement, which with Camden's Good Mixer pub and Blow Up club was at the core of the pre-Britpop scene.

In 1994 a 3 track e.p 'Big Banger' was released on the Lowlife label. The line up now included the Pitcher brothers, Steve Burgan on guitar and Lawrence Shaft on drums. UK tours followed and a live session featured on BBC Radio 1's Mark Radcliffe show.

A second album Electric Colour Climax, followed on Lowlife Records in 1996. The band again courted controversy, with a sleeve featuring a retro pornographic image, found at London's Toe Rag Studies where the band had recorded the album on vintage recording equipment in five days.

The band drifted apart around 1999, with the Pitcher brothers forming Cheetah. Wise and Kenny had, meanwhile, started a new band called Society who continue to write and perform material to the present day.

Nick Pitcher has a family of groups, Rex Speedway and Thee Fortune Tellers, Rex Speedway and the Denim Avengers, Rex Speedway and the Majestic 12 and Rex Speedway and the MKUltra. These groups consist of some of the finest garage musicians in Brighton with a glowing CV.

References

External links 

SPITFIRE BANDCAMP PAGE (All Eve Recordings EPs available to purchase here)
 spitfire-uk.bandcamp.com

SPITFIRE 'WILD SUNSHINE' VIDEO (From Eve Recordings YouTube Channel)
 www.youtube.com
 Spitfire Website

English rock music groups
Musical groups from West Sussex